USS Ostrich is a name used more than once by the United States Navy, and may refer to:

 , a patrol boat in commission from 1917 to 1918
 , a coastal minesweeper in service from 1941 to 1945
 , a minesweeper originally named USS YMS-430, in commission from 1944 to 1946 and again from 1946 to 1957, renamed USS Ostrich in 1947

United States Navy ship names